Eclipses may occur repeatedly, separated by certain intervals of time: these intervals are called eclipse cycles.  The series of eclipses separated by a repeat of one of these intervals is called an eclipse series.

Eclipse conditions 

Eclipses may occur when Earth and the Moon are aligned with the Sun, and the shadow of one body projected by the Sun falls on the other. So at new moon, when the Moon is in conjunction with the Sun, the Moon may pass in front of the Sun as viewed from a narrow region on the surface of Earth and cause a solar eclipse. At full moon, when the Moon is in opposition to the Sun, the Moon may pass through the shadow of Earth, and a lunar eclipse is visible from the night half of Earth. The conjunction and opposition of the Moon together have a special name: syzygy (Greek for "junction"), because of the importance of these lunar phases.

An eclipse does not occur at every new or full moon, because the plane of the Moon's orbit around Earth is tilted with respect to the plane of Earth's orbit around the Sun (the ecliptic): so as viewed from Earth, when the Moon appears nearest the Sun (at new moon) or furthest from it (at full moon), the three bodies are usually not exactly on the same line.

This inclination is on average about 5° 9′, much larger than the apparent mean diameter of the Sun (32′ 2″), the Moon as viewed from Earth's surface directly below the Moon (31′ 37″), and Earth's shadow at the mean lunar distance (1° 23′).

Therefore, at most new moons, Earth passes too far north or south of the lunar shadow, and at most full moons, the Moon misses Earth's shadow. Also, at most solar eclipses, the apparent angular diameter of the Moon is insufficient to fully occlude the solar disc, unless the Moon is around its perigee, i.e. nearer Earth and apparently larger than average. In any case, the alignment must be almost perfect to cause an eclipse.

An eclipse can occur only when the Moon is on or near the plane of Earth's orbit, i.e. when its ecliptic latitude is low. This happens when the Moon is around either of the two orbital nodes on the ecliptic at the time of the syzygy. Of course, to produce an eclipse, the Sun must also be around a node at that time – the same node for a solar eclipse or the opposite node for a lunar eclipse.

Recurrence 

Up to three eclipses may occur during an eclipse season, a one- or two-month period that happens twice a year, around the time when the Sun is near the nodes of the Moon's orbit.

An eclipse does not occur every month, because one month after an eclipse the relative geometry of the Sun, Moon, and Earth has changed.

As seen from the Earth, the time it takes for the Moon to return to a node, the draconic month, is less than the time it takes for the Moon to return to the same ecliptic longitude as the Sun: the synodic month. Secondly, the orbital nodes of the Moon precess westward in ecliptic longitude, completing a full circle in about  18.60 years, so a draconic month is shorter than a sidereal month. In all, the difference in period between synodic and draconic month is nearly  days. Likewise, as seen from the Earth, the Sun passes both nodes as it moves along its ecliptic path. The period for the Sun to return to a node is called the eclipse or draconic year: about 346.6201 days, which is about  year shorter than a sidereal year because of the precession of the nodes.

If a solar eclipse occurs at one new moon, which must be close to a node, then at the next full moon the Moon is already more than a day past its opposite node, and may or may not miss the Earth's shadow. By the next new moon it is even further ahead of the node, so it is less likely that there will be a solar eclipse somewhere on Earth. By the next month, there will certainly be no event.

However, about 5 or 6 lunations later the new moon will fall close to the opposite node. In that time (half an eclipse year) the Sun will have moved to the opposite node too, so the circumstances will again be suitable for one or more eclipses.

Periodicity 

The periodicity of solar eclipses is the interval between any two solar eclipses in succession, which will be either 1, 5, or 6 synodic months. It is calculated that the earth will experience a total number of 11,898 solar eclipses between 2000 BCE and 3000 CE. A particular solar eclipse will be repeated approximately after every 18 years 11 days and 8 hours (6,585.32 days) of period, but not in the same geographical region.
A particular geographical region will experience a particular solar eclipse in every 54 years 34 days period. Total solar eclipses are rare events, although they occur somewhere on Earth every 18 months on average,

Repetition of solar eclipses
For the repetition of a solar eclipse, the geometric alignment of the Earth, Moon and Sun, as well as some parameters of the lunar orbit should be repeated. The following parameters and criteria must be repeated for the repetition of a solar eclipse:
 The Moon must be in new phase.
 The longitude of perigee or apogee of the Moon must be the same.
 The longitude of the ascending node or descending node must be the same.
 The Earth will be nearly the same distance from the Sun, and tilted to it in nearly the same orientation.
These conditions are related with the three periods of the Moon's orbital motion, viz. the synodic month, anomalistic month and draconic month. In other words, a particular eclipse will be repeated only if the Moon will complete roughly an integer number of synodic, draconic, and anomalistic periods (223, 242, and 239) and the Earth-Sun-Moon geometry will be nearly identical to that eclipse. The Moon will be at the same node and the same distance from the Earth. Gamma changes monotonically throughout any single Saros series. The change in gamma is larger when Earth is near its aphelion (June to July) than when it is near perihelion (December to January). When the Earth is near its average distance (March to April or September to October), the change in gamma is average.

Repetition of lunar eclipses
For the repetition of a lunar eclipse, the geometric alignment of the Moon, Earth and Sun, as well as some parameters of the lunar orbit should be repeated. The following parameters and criteria must be repeated for the repetition of a lunar eclipse:
 The Moon must be in full phase.
 The longitude of perigee or apogee of the Moon must be the same.
 The longitude of the ascending node or descending node must be the same.
 The Earth will be nearly the same distance from the Sun, and tilted to it in nearly the same orientation.
These conditions are related with the three periods of the Moon's orbital motion, viz. the synodic month, anomalistic month and draconic month. In other words, a particular eclipse will be repeated only if the Moon will complete roughly an integer number of synodic, draconic, and anomalistic periods (223, 242, and 239) and the Earth-Sun-Moon geometry will be nearly identical to that eclipse. The Moon will be at the same node and the same distance from the Earth. Gamma changes monotonically throughout any single Saros series. The change in gamma is larger when Earth is near its aphelion (June to July) than when it is near perihelion (December to January). When the Earth is near its average distance (March to April or September to October), the change in gamma is average.

Eclipses would not occur in every month

Another thing to consider is that the motion of the Moon is not a perfect circle.  Its orbit is distinctly elliptic, so the lunar distance from Earth varies throughout the lunar cycle. This varying distance changes the apparent diameter of the Moon, and therefore influences the chances, duration, and type (partial, annular, total, mixed) of an eclipse.  This orbital period is called the anomalistic month, and together with the synodic month causes the so-called "full moon cycle" of about 14 lunations in the timings and appearances of full (and new) Moons. The Moon moves faster when it is closer to the Earth (near perigee) and slower when it is near apogee (furthest distance), thus periodically changing the timing of syzygies by up to 14 hours either side (relative to their mean timing), and causing the apparent lunar angular diameter to increase or decrease by about 6%.  An eclipse cycle must comprise close to an integer number of anomalistic months in order to perform well in predicting eclipses.

If the Earth had a perfectly circular orbit centered around the Sun, and the Moon's orbit was also perfectly circular and centered around the Earth, and both orbits were coplanar (on the same plane) with each other, then two eclipses would happen every lunar month (29.53 days). A lunar eclipse would occur at every full moon, a solar eclipse every new moon, and all solar eclipses would be the same type. In fact the distances between the Earth and Moon and that of the Earth and the Sun vary because both the Earth and the Moon have elliptic orbits. Also, both the orbits are not on the same plane. The Moon's orbit is inclined about 5.14° to Earth's orbit around the Sun. So the Moon's orbit crosses the ecliptic at two points or nodes. If a New Moon takes place within about 17° of a node, then a solar eclipse will be visible from some location on Earth.

At an average angular velocity of 0.99° per day, the Sun takes 34.5 days to cross the 34° wide eclipse zone centered on each node. Because the Moon's orbit with respect to the Sun has a mean duration of 29.53 days, there will always be one and possibly two solar eclipses during each 34.5-day interval when the Sun passes through the nodal eclipse zones. These time periods are called eclipse seasons. Either two or three eclipses happen each eclipse season. During the eclipse season, the inclination of the Moon's orbit is low, hence the Sun, Moon, and Earth become aligned straight enough (in syzygy) for an eclipse to occur.

Numerical values 

These are the lengths of the various types of months as discussed above (according to the lunar ephemeris ELP2000-85, valid for the epoch J2000.0; taken from (e.g.) Meeus (1991) ):

    SM =  29.530588853 days   (Synodic month)
    DM =  27.212220817 days   (Draconic month)
    AM =  27.55454988  days   (Anomalistic month)
    EY = 346.620076    days   (Eclipse year)

Note that there are three main moving points: the Sun, the Moon, and the (ascending) node; and that there are three main periods, when each of the three possible pairs of moving points meet one another: the synodic month when the Moon returns to the Sun, the draconic month when the Moon returns to the node, and the eclipse year when the Sun returns to the node.  These three 2-way relations are not independent (i.e. both the synodic month and eclipse year are dependent on the apparent motion of the Sun, both the draconic month and eclipse year are dependent on the motion of the nodes), and indeed the eclipse year can be described as the beat period of the synodic and draconic months (i.e. the period of the difference between the synodic and draconic months); in formula:

as can be checked by filling in the numerical values listed above.

Eclipse cycles have a period in which a certain number of synodic months closely equals an integer or half-integer number of draconic months: one such period after an eclipse, a syzygy (new moon or full moon) takes place again near a node of the Moon's orbit on the ecliptic, and an eclipse can occur again.  However, the synodic and draconic months are incommensurate: their ratio is not an integer number. We need to approximate this ratio by common fractions: the numerators and denominators then give the multiples of the two periods – draconic and synodic months – that (approximately) span the same amount of time, representing an eclipse cycle.

These fractions can be found by the method of continued fractions: this arithmetical technique provides a series of progressively better approximations of any real numeric value by proper fractions.

Since there may be an eclipse every half draconic month, we need to find approximations for the number of half draconic months per synodic month: so the target ratio to approximate is: SM / (DM/2) = 29.530588853 / (27.212220817/2) = 2.170391682

The continued fractions expansion for this ratio is:

 2.170391682 = [2;5,1,6,1,1,1,1,1,11,1,...]:
 Quotients  Convergents
            half DM/SM     decimal      named cycle (if any)
     2;           2/1    = 2
     5           11/5    = 2.2
     1           13/6    = 2.166666667  semester
     6           89/41   = 2.170731707  hepton
     1          102/47   = 2.170212766  octon
     1          191/88   = 2.170454545  tzolkinex
     1          293/135  = 2.170370370  tritos
     1          484/223  = 2.170403587  saros
     1          777/358  = 2.170391061  inex
    11         9031/4161 = 2.170391732  selebit
     1         9808/4519 = 2.170391679  square year
   ...

The ratio of synodic months per half eclipse year yields the same series:

 5.868831091 = [5;1,6,1,1,1,1,1,11,1,...]
 Quotients  Convergents
            SM/half EY  decimal        SM/full EY  named cycle
     5;      5/1      = 5
     1       6/1      = 6              12/1        semester
     6      41/7      = 5.857142857                hepton
     1      47/8      = 5.875          47/4        octon
     1      88/15     = 5.866666667                tzolkinex
     1     135/23     = 5.869565217                tritos
     1     223/38     = 5.868421053   223/19       saros
     1     358/61     = 5.868852459   716/61       inex
    11    4161/709    = 5.868829337
     1    4519/770    = 5.868831169  4519/385
   ...

Each of these is an eclipse cycle.  Less accurate cycles may be constructed by combinations of these.

Eclipse cycles 
This table summarizes the characteristics of various eclipse cycles, and can be computed from the numerical results of the preceding paragraphs; cf. Meeus (1997) Ch.9. More details are given in the comments below, and several notable cycles have their own pages.

Any eclipse cycle, and indeed the interval between any two eclipses, can be expressed as a combination of saros (s) and inex (i) intervals. These are listed in the column "formula".

Notes

Fortnight Half a synodic month (29.53 days). When there is an eclipse, there is a fair chance that at the next syzygy there will be another eclipse: the Sun and Moon will have moved about 15° with respect to the nodes (the Moon being opposite to where it was the previous time), but the luminaries may still be within bounds to make an eclipse. For example, penumbral lunar eclipse of May 26, 2002 is followed by the annular solar eclipse of June 10, 2002 and penumbral lunar eclipse of June 24, 2002. The shortest lunar fortnight (between new and full moons) lasts only about 13 days and 21.5 hours, while the longest lunar fortnight (between new and full moons) lasts about 15 days and 14.5 hours. The shortest lunar fortnight (between first and last quarter moons) lasts only about 13 days and 12 hours, while the longest lunar fortnight (between first and last quarter moons) lasts about 16 days and 2 hours.
For more information see eclipse season.
Synodic month Similarly, two events one synodic month apart have the Sun and Moon at two positions on either side of the node, 29° apart: both may cause a partial eclipse. For a lunar eclipse, it is a penumbral lunar eclipse.
Pentalunex 5 synodic months. Successive solar or lunar eclipses may occur 1, 5 or 6 synodic months apart.
Semester Half a lunar year. Eclipses will repeat exactly one semester apart at alternating nodes in a cycle that lasts for 8 eclipses. Because it is close to a half integer of anomalistic, draconic months, and tropical years, each solar eclipse will alternate between hemispheres each semester, as well as alternate between total and annular. Hence there can be a maximum of one total or annular eclipse each in a given year. (For a lunar eclipse, eclipses will repeat exactly one semester apart at alternating nodes in a cycle that lasts for 8 eclipses. Because it is close to a half integer of anomalistic, draconic months, and tropical years, each lunar eclipse will alternate between edges of Earth's shadow each semester, as well as alternate between Lunar Perigee and Lunar Apogee. Hence there can be a maximum of one Lunar Perigee or Lunar Apogee each in a given year.)
Lunar year Twelve (synodic) months, a little longer than an eclipse year: the Sun has returned to the node, so eclipses may again occur.:
Hepton 7 eclipse seasons, and one of the less noteworthy eclipse cycles. Each eclipse in a hepton is followed by an eclipse 3 saros series before, always occurring at alternating nodes. For solar (or lunar) eclipses, it is equal to 41 synodic months (1211 solar days).
Each octon in a series is 2 saros apart, always occurring at the same node. For solar (or lunar) eclipses, it is equal to 47 synodic months (1388 solar days).
Tzolkinex Includes a half draconic month, so occurs at alternating nodes and alternates between hemispheres. Each consecutive eclipse is a member of preceding saros series from the one before. Equal to ten tzolk'ins. Every third tzolkinex in a series is near an integer number of anomalistic months and so will have similar properties.
Sar (half saros) Includes an odd number of fortnights (223). As a result, eclipses alternate between lunar and solar with each cycle, occurring at the same node and with similar characteristics. A solar eclipse with small gamma will be followed by a very central total lunar eclipse. A solar eclipse where the moon's penumbra just barely grazes the southern limb of earth will be followed half a saros later by a lunar eclipse where the moon just grazes the southern limb of the earth's penumbra.
Tritos A mediocre cycle, relates to the saros like the inex. A triple tritos is close to an integer number of anomalistic months and so will have similar properties.
Saros The best known eclipse cycle, and one of the best for predicting eclipses, in which 223 synodic months equal 242 draconic months with an error of only 51 minutes. It is also close to 239 anomalistic months, which makes the circumstances between two eclipses one saros apart very similar.
Metonic cycle or enneadecaeteris This is nearly equal to 19 tropical years, but is also 5 "octon" periods and close to 20 eclipse years: so it yields a short series of eclipses on the same calendar date. It consists of 110 hollow months and 125 full months, so nominally 6940 days, and equals 235 lunations (235 synodic months) with an error of only around 7.5 hours.
Inex Very convenient in the classification of eclipse cycles. Inex series, after a sputtering beginning, go on for many thousands of years giving eclipses every 29 years or so. One inex after an eclipse, another eclipse takes place at almost the same longitude, but at the opposite latitude.
Exeligmos A triple saros, with the advantage that it has nearly an integer number of days, so the next eclipse will be visible at locations near the eclipse that occurred one exeligmos earlier, in contrast to the saros, in which the eclipse occurs about 8 hours later in the day or about 120° to the west of the eclipse that occurred one saros earlier.
Callippic cycle 441 hollow months and 499 full months; thus 4 Metonic cycles minus one day or precisely 76 years of  days. It equals 940 lunations with an error of only 5.9 hours.
Triad A triple inex, with the advantage that it has nearly an integer number of anomalistic months, which makes the circumstances between two eclipses one Triad apart very similar, but at the opposite latitude. Almost exactly 87 calendar years minus 2 months. The triad means that every third saros series will be similar (mostly total central eclipses or annular central eclipses for example). Saros 130, 133, 136, 139, 142 and 145, for example, all produce mainly total central eclipses.
Hipparchic cycle Not a noteworthy eclipse cycle, but Hipparchus constructed it to closely match an integer number of synodic and anomalistic months, years (345), and days. By comparing his own eclipse observations with Babylonian records from 345 years earlier, he could verify the accuracy of the various periods that the Chaldeans used.
Babylonian The ratio 5923 returns to latitude in 5458 months was used by the Chaldeans in their astronomical computations.
Tetradia Sometimes 4 total lunar eclipses occur in a row with intervals of 6 lunations (semester), and this is called a tetrad. Giovanni Schiaparelli noticed that there are eras when such tetrads occur comparatively frequently, interrupted by eras when they are rare. This variation takes about 6 centuries. Antonie Pannekoek (1951) offered an explanation for this phenomenon and found a period of 591 years. Van den Bergh (1954) from Theodor von Oppolzer's Canon der Finsternisse found a period of 586 years. This happens to be an eclipse cycle; see Meeus [I] (1997). Recently Tudor Hughes explained the variation from secular changes in the eccentricity of the Earth's orbit: the period for occurrence of tetrads is variable and currently is about 565 years; see Meeus III (2004) for a detailed discussion.

Saros series and inex series
Any eclipse can be assigned to a given saros series and inex series. The year of a solar eclipse (in the Gregorian calendar) is then given approximately by:

year = 28.945 × number of the saros series + 18.030 × number of the inex series − 2882.55

When this is greater than 1, the integer part gives the year AD, but when it is negative the year BC is obtained by taking the integer part and adding 2. For instance, the eclipse in saros series 0 and inex series 0 was in the middle of 2884 BC.

See also 
 Saros (astronomy)

References

 S. Newcomb (1882): On the recurrence of solar eclipses.  Astron.Pap.Am.Eph. vol. I pt. I .  Bureau of Navigation, Navy Dept., Washington 1882
 J.N. Stockwell (1901): Eclips-cycles.  Astron.J. 504 [vol.xx1(24)], 14-Aug-1901
 A.C.D. Crommelin (1901): The 29-year eclipse cycle.  Observatory xxiv nr.310, 379, Oct-1901
 A. Pannekoek (1951): Periodicities in Lunar Eclipses.  Proc. Kon. Ned. Acad. Wetensch. Ser.B vol.54 pp. 30..41 (1951)
 G. van den Bergh (1954): Eclipses in the second millennium B.C.  Tjeenk Willink & Zn NV, Haarlem 1954
 G. van den Bergh (1955): Periodicity and Variation of Solar (and Lunar) Eclipses, 2 vols.  Tjeenk Willink & Zn NV, Haarlem 1955
 Jean Meeus (1991): Astronomical Algorithms (1st ed.).  Willmann-Bell, Richmond VA 1991; 
 Jean Meeus (1997): Mathematical Astronomy Morsels [I], Ch.9 Solar Eclipses: Some Periodicities (pp. 49..55). Willmann-Bell, Richmond VA 1997; 
 Jean Meeus (2004): Mathematical Astronomy Morsels III, Ch.21 Lunar Tetrads (pp. 123..140). Willmann-Bell, Richmond VA 2004;

External links 
 A Catalogue of Eclipse Cycles (more comprehensive than the above)
 Search 5,000 years worth of eclipses
 Eclipses, Cosmic Clockwork of the Ancients
 The Saros and the Inex

Eclipses
Time in astronomy
Technical factors of astrology